Manu Ahotaeiloa (born 12 January 1986) is a Tongan rugby union player who currently plays for Agen in the Top 14 competition. He plays as a centre.

References

External links
Toulouse profile

1986 births
Living people
Stade Toulousain players
Rugby union centres
Expatriate rugby union players in France
Tongan expatriate rugby union players
Tongan expatriate sportspeople in France